Sadique a variant of Sadik is a given name and surname. It may refer to:

Given name
Sadique Abubakar (born 1960), Nigerian Air Marshal and Chief of Air Staff of the Nigerian Airforce 
Sadique Henry (born 1994), West Indian cricketer
Sadique Khan Kanju or Siddiq Khan Kanju (died 2001), Pakistani politician and Minister of State for Foreign Affairs
Sadique Mohammed (born 1938), West Indian cricket umpire

Surname
Halimah Mohamed Sadique (born 1962), Malaysian politician and Member of Parliament
Ismat Ara Sadique (1941–2020), Bangladeshi politician and minister
Muhammad Sadique (born 1983), Pakistani-born Irish cricketer
Shibli Sadique, Bangladeshi politician and Member of Parliament